Entropy is an online magazine that covers literary and related non-literary content. The magazine features personal essays, reviews, experimental literature, poetry, interviews, as well as writings on small press culture, video games, performance, graphic novels, interactive literature, science fiction, fantasy, music, film, art, translation, and other topics. Entropy's website also functions as a place where those within the literary community can interact. 

Since its launch, the magazine has attracted notable contributors, such as Will Alexander, John Vercher, Seo-Young Chu, Amish Trivedi, Gabino Iglesias, C. Kubasta, Justin Petropoulos, Daniel Borzutzky, Anne Casey, Michael J. Seidlinger, and others. It is widely known for its yearly lists of the best  poetry, articles, music, and more. Entropy has also established a reputation as being as safe publishing space for essays written on the subject of #MeToo and related issues.

In June 2017, Civil Coping Mechanisms, Entropy, and Writ Large Press created a partnership, known as The Accomplices. In August 2018, they formed The Accomplices LLC and launched their new website and cohesive brand in January 2019. The group publishes books, produces literary workshops and events, creates videos and other media, and runs a literary website and community space.

References

External links
 
 The Accomplices partnership website

American review websites
Magazines established in 2014
Online literary magazines published in the United States
Poetry magazines published in the United States